Don Lincoln (born 1964) is an American physicist, author, host of the YouTube channel Fermilab, and science communicator. He conducts research in particle physics at Fermi National Accelerator Laboratory, and was an adjunct professor of physics at the University of Notre Dame, although he is no longer affiliated with the university. He received a Ph.D. in experimental particle physics from Rice University in 1994. In 1995, he was a co-discoverer of the top quark. He has co-authored hundreds of research papers, and more recently, was a member of the team that discovered the Higgs boson in 2012.

Publications 
Lincoln is a public speaker, science writer, and has contributed many scientific articles to magazines that include Analog Science Fiction and Fact in July 2009, Scientific American in November 2012, and July 2015, and The Physics Teacher many times. He is also the author of books for the public about particle physics. His most recent book is 'Einstein's Unfinished Dream'  (2023)
and it is published by Oxford University Press.  His earlier books include 'Understanding the Universe: From Quarks to the Cosmos (Revised edition)' (2012), 'The Quantum Frontier: The Large Hadron Collider' (2009), and 'The Large Hadron Collider: The Extraordinary Story of the Higgs Boson and Other Things That Will Blow Your Mind' (2014). In 2013, he released a book called 'Alien Universe: Extraterrestrials in our Minds and in the Cosmos', which explains how the common images of extraterrestrials came to enter Western culture, and then goes on to explore what modern physics, chemistry, and biology can tell us about what real intelligent alien life might be like. He has been involved in a number of videos dedicated to disseminating discoveries in particle physics, and since July 7, 2011, has been a keynote speaker for a series produced by Fermilab that explores the range of issues dominating particle physics today in an accessible, and sometimes humorous way. Among the topics included in the series are the Higgs boson, antimatter, the nature of neutrinos, the concepts of the Big Bang, cosmic inflation, the multiverse, leptogenesis, and supersymmetry.

After years of being involved in research using the DZero detector at the Fermilab Tevatron, he joined the Compact Muon Solenoid (CMS) experiment on the Large Hadron Collider at CERN, Geneva, Switzerland. Lincoln has co-authored more than 1500 CMS papers. His popularizations also include columns that translate CMS (monthly) and DZero (biweekly) physics measurements for the public. He is also the author of a recurring segment, Physics in a Nutshell, in the Fermilab online newspaper, he blogs for the website of the television series NOVA, and he writes for Live Science, Big Think, and CNN. Additionally, he has created over 100 videos that translate particle physics and cosmology for a lay audience. In collaboration with The Teaching Company, he has released video courses that outlined the scientific community's modern understanding of a theory of everything, common misconceptions of science, and why scientists believe some of the mind-boggling claims of modern physics.

Honors 
Lincoln is a Fellow of the American Physical Society, a Fellow of the American Association for the Advancement of Science, and recipient of the 2013 European Physical Society HEPP Outreach award “for communicating in multiple media the excitement of High Energy Physics to high-school students and teachers, and the public at large”. He also was awarded the 2017 American Institute of Physics Gemant Award for "cultural, artistic or humanistic contributions to physics for achievements in communication and public outreach".

References

External references 

Don Lincoln at Notre Dame

21st-century American physicists
Living people
Rose–Hulman Institute of Technology alumni
Rice University alumni
University of Notre Dame faculty
Fermilab
1964 births
People associated with CERN
People associated with Fermilab
American YouTubers
Education-related YouTube channels
Fellows of the American Physical Society